Brandon Rogers may refer to:

 Brandon Rogers (ice hockey) (born 1982), American ice hockey player
 Brandon Rogers (YouTuber) (born 1988), American comedian, actor and director

See also
Brendan Rodgers (disambiguation)